Santiago Zurbriggen (born 27 February 1990) is an Argentine footballer who plays for Estudiantes de Río Cuarto as a right-back.

References

External links

1990 births
Living people
Association football defenders
Argentine footballers
Argentine people of Swiss-German descent
Unión de Santa Fe footballers
Club Atlético Lanús footballers
Defensa y Justicia footballers
Club Atlético Alvarado players
Estudiantes de Buenos Aires footballers
Estudiantes de Río Cuarto footballers
Argentine Primera División players
Primera Nacional players